3C75 (a.k.a. 3C 75) is a binary black hole system in the Abell 400 cluster of galaxies. It has four radio jets (two from each accreting black hole). It is travelling at 1200 kilometers per second through the cluster plasma, causing the jets to be swept back. The binary supermassive black holes are themselves contained in the dumbbell shaped galaxy NGC 1128. 3C 75 may be X-ray source 2A 0252+060 (1H 0253+058, XRS 02522+060).

References

External links
What is known about 3C 75
Binary Black Hole in 3C 75.  Astronomy Picture of the Day. 2010 March 14 
NRAO press release
Visible image of 3C75 binary

  Simbad MCG+B01-08-027

Supermassive black holes
075
Abell 400
075
Cetus (constellation)